Mladen is a South Slavic masculine given name, derived from the Slavic root mlad, meaning "young". It is present in Bulgarian, Serbian, and Croatian society since the Middle Ages.

Notable people with the name include:

 Mladen (vojvoda) ( 1323–26), Serbian magnate
 
 Mladen Bartolović, Bosnian footballer
 Mladen Dolar, Slovenian philosopher
 Mladen Erjavec, Croatian basketball coach
 Mladen Krstajić, Serbian footballer
 Mladen Milicevic, composer of music
 Mladen Petrić, Croatian footballer
 Mladen Plakalović, Bosnian cross-country skier
 Mladen Rudonja, Slovenian footballer
 Mladen Šekularac, Montenegrin basketball player
 Mladen George Sekulovich, American actor best known as Karl Malden
 Mladen Solomun, Bosnian-born German DJ and producer best known as Solomun
 Mladen Stanev, Bulgarian conductor and chorus master
 Mladen Stojanović, Bosnian Serb leader of Yugoslav Partisans
 Mladen Vasilev, Bulgarian footballer
 Mladen Vladojević ( 1330–48), Serbian magnate

See also
 
 Mladenov
 Mladenović
 Slavic names

References

Slavic masculine given names
Bosnian masculine given names
Bulgarian masculine given names
Croatian masculine given names
Serbian masculine given names
Macedonian masculine given names